The Peoples Ford Boghall and Bathgate Caledonia Pipe Band is a pipe band from West Lothian, Scotland which formed in 1972. The band has competed in Grade 1 since being promoted to that level in 1980. 

Throughout its competitive history, the band has not won the World Pipe Band Championships, though it has been runner up four times and has won the drum corps prize 6 times to date under Tom Brown MBE and his son Gordon Brown.

History 
In 1972, a few townspeople of Boghall in West Lothian decided that they would try to form a pipe band. An advertisement was put in the local newspaper for young people wanting to learn the pipes or drums, and a group of primarily young players began practising at a Bathgate school. As with many youth bands, numerous adults and committee members from the community were necessary to keep the band running during its early years.

The band rose quickly through the lower grades and a Novice grade band was created in 1977 to handle additional youth who were joining the band. By 1978, the original band had won the Champion of Champions title in Grade Two while the Novice band was upgraded to Juvenile.

The senior band was promoted to Grade 1 in 1980, and throughout the subsequent decade its drum corps won every single major drumming prize. The band as a whole proceeded to win the Scottish, British and European Championships during that decade.

Band
The Pipe Major of the band is Ross Harvey, who joined the band in 1994 and became pipe major at the end of the 2015 season. The Leading Drummer is Gordon Brown.

Performances
The band travelled to Ontario in 2013 for the 50th anniversary of the Cobourg Highland Games, to compete and perform in concert. Individual members of the band have also been successful in solo competitions.

Results
The band has won awards in Grades 1, 2, 3, and 4 as well as at Juvenile and Novice Juvenile levels.

Pipe Majors
Bobby Allan (1972)
Kenny Watson (1972)
Bob Martin (1972–1986)
Craig Walker (1986–1996)
Ross Walker (1996–2015)
Ross Harvey (2015-    )

Leading Drummers
David Steadman (1972-1978)
Tom Brown (1978–1992)
Gordon Brown (1992- 2022)
  Kerr McQuillan (2022-)

Discography
Debut Album (1984)
The Rubik Cube (1989)
Inspired in Belfast (2001)
In Concert (2004)
Forte (2013)

External links

References

Musical groups established in 1972
Grade 1 pipe bands
Scottish pipe bands
1972 establishments in Scotland
Bathgate